Sega Ninja, originally released as  in Japan, is a run and gun video game released in arcades by Sega in 1985. The game features Princess Kurumi (くるみ姫 Kurumi-Hime), the titular female ninja, battling enemies using throwing knives and throwing stars. The game was originally released in arcades as Ninja Princess in Japan and Sega Ninja internationally. In contrast to most later games in the genre, Ninja Princess has a feudal Japan setting with a female ninja protagonist who throws shuriken and knives.

A revised edition for the Sega Mark III console titled Ninja Princess 1 Mega Ban - Ninja (忍者プリンセス1メガ版 忍者) was released in 1986, replacing the female protagonist with a male ninja protagonist who has to rescue her. This version was subsequently released as The Ninja for the Master System internationally.

Gameplay

Ninja Princess is a run and gun video game. The gameplay involves player shooting enemies and defeating bosses along the way. Enemies include samurai, ninja and dogs. The player's normal weapons are an unlimited supply of throwing knives, but power-ups to throwing stars are available; in addition, the player can also turn invisible for a short period of time. While most of the stages are vertically scrolling, a few of the levels add some variety - including a level where the player must scale a wall.

Plot
The game is set during Japan's Edo period, in about the year 1630, in a province called Ohkami in the western region, where the power has been seized by an evil tyrant named Gyokuro. The goal is to end his oppressive rule and restore peace.

Release

Ports of the game were released for Sega's SG-1000 and Master System consoles. The latter version, retitled Ninja Princess 1 Mega Ban - Ninja, was released a year after the arcade game and changed the protagonist from female to male. Other changes include the rearranging of stages from the original Japanese release in western releases of the game as well as a scroll system, which requires that five green scrolls must be collected to get to the final level of the game, as all of them give hints on how the final level must be entered. If the player finishes the game without them, the game will backtrack to a level closest to where a missing scroll lies. Graphics are also different, made in a more realistic style.

Reception
In Japan, Game Machine listed Ninja Princess on their May 1, 1985 issue as being the most-successful table arcade cabinet of the month.

Computer Gaming World stated that the Master System version was the most entertaining of three martial-arts games that Sega released together (the others were Black Belt and Kung Fu Kid), and approved of its unusual visual perspective.

Legacy
In 2017, Sam Derboo of Hardcore Gaming 101 noted that Ninja Princess predates Capcom's genre-popularizing run-and-gun shooter Commando (1985), and he considers Ninja Princess to be "in some ways the more advanced concept." While he considered Commando to be a refinement of Taito's Front Line (1982), he said that Ninja Princess brought "a fresh setting and interesting new elements." He also praises the female protagonist, but criticizes the console versions for making the protagonist a male ninja who has to rescue her instead. He nevertheless considers it "no doubt one of the better overhead run-n-gun shooters out in the mid-’80s."

Sega Ninja is a plot point in the novel Ready Player Two (2020).

Notes

References

External links

1985 video games
Arcade video games
Run and gun games
Sega video games
Sega arcade games
Master System games
SG-1000 games
Sega System 1 games
Video games about ninja
Video games featuring female protagonists
Video games developed in Japan